Stadio Fratelli Paschiero is a multi-use stadium in Cuneo, Italy.  It is currently used mostly for football matches and is the home ground of Cuneo.  The stadium holds 3,060.

External links
Stadio Fratelli Paschiero at Soccerway

Fratelli Paschiero
A.C. Cuneo 1905